These are the results of 2019 BWF World Senior Championships' 35+ events.

Men's singles

Seeds 
  Liu Lung-hsiang (second round)
  Yoshitaka Yone (second round)
  Niels Christian Blittrup (second round)
  Hendrik Westermeyer (second round)
  Andrew Aspinal (second round)
  Maxim Muzhevlev (second round)
  Arak Bhokanandh (first round)
  Wu Te-wei (first round)

Finals

Top half

Section 1

Section 2

Bottom half

Section 3

Section 4

Women's singles

Seeds 
  Perrine Le Buhanic (silver medalist)
  Mette K. Pedersen (third round)
  Joanna Dix (bronze medalist)
  Noriko Sanada (quarterfinals)
  Parul Rawat (second round)
  Cecilia Närfors (third round)
  Audrey Petit (second round)
  Wendy Fredriksson (third round)

Finals

Top half

Section 1

Section 2

Bottom half

Section 3

Section 4

Men's doubles

Seeds 
  Thorsten Hukriede / Hendrik Westermeyer (quarterfinals)
  Joy T. Antony / Sanave Thomas (quarterfinals)
  Naruenart Chuaymak / Atipong Kitjanon (quarterfinals)
  Chen Chien-kuang / Tsai Ming-wei  (bronze medalists)
  Paul Freeman / Philip Troke (third round)
  Tommy Sørensen / Jesper Thomsen (gold medalists)
  Sébastien Coto / Marc de la Giroday (third round)
  Jens Marmsten / Dennis von Dahn (bronze medalists)

Finals

Top half

Section 1

Section 2

Bottom half

Section 3

Section 4

Women's doubles

Seeds 
  Jenny Kruseborn / Cecilia Närfors (second round)
  Noriko Sanada / Sayaka Ueyama (quarterfinals)
  Hélène Dijoux / Audrey Petit (gold medalists)
  Sarah Burgess / Joanna Dix (silver medalists)

Finals

Top half

Section 1

Section 2

Bottom half

Section 3

Section 4

Mixed doubles

Seeds 
  Felix Hoffmann / Claudia Vogelgsang (third round)
  Tommy Sørensen / Lisbeth T. Haagensen (gold medalists)
  Mark King / Mhairi Armstrong (bronze medalists)
  Thomas Blondeau / Hélène Dijoux (third round)
  Fredrik du Hane /  Lynne Swan (quarterfinals)
  Eiji Betsumori / Noriko Sanada (second round)
  Niels Christian Blittrup / Tanja Blittrup (quarterfinals)
  Tomas Ahlgren / Cecilia Närfors (second round)

Finals

Top half

Section 1

Section 2

Bottom half

Section 3

Section 4

References 
Men's singles
Women's singles
Men's doubles
Women's doubles
Mixed doubles

2019 BWF World Senior Championships